Ephoron is a genus of mayflies in the family Polymitarcyidae. There are about 15 described species in Ephoron.

Species
These 15 species belong to the genus Ephoron:

 Ephoron album (Say, 1824) i c g b (white fly)
 Ephoron annandalei (Chopra, 1927) c g
 Ephoron birmanus Navás, 1933 c g
 Ephoron eophilum Ishiwata, 1996 c g
 Ephoron indica (Pictet, 1843) c g
 Ephoron leucon Williamson, 1802 c g
 Ephoron leukon Williamson, 1802 i g b (white fly)
 Ephoron limnobium Ishiwata, 1996 c g
 Ephoron nakamurae Matsumura, 1941 c g
 Ephoron nanchangi (Hsu, 1937) c g
 Ephoron nigridorsum (Tshernova, 1934) c g
 Ephoron punensis (Dubey, 1971) c g
 Ephoron savignyi (Pictet, 1843) c g
 Ephoron shigae (Takahashi, 1924) c g
 Ephoron virgo (Olivier, 1791) c g

Data sources: i = ITIS, c = Catalogue of Life, g = GBIF, b = Bugguide.net

References

Further reading

External links

 

Mayflies
Articles created by Qbugbot